Arkansas Highway 55 may refer to:
Arkansas Highway 55 (1926-1958), now numbered 355
Interstate 55 in Arkansas, created in the late 1950s